Rangers is a common association football club name

Andorran team 
 FC Rànger's

Australian team 
 Balgownie Rangers FC

Chilean team 
 Rangers de Talca

English teams 
 Concord Rangers F.C.
 Cullompton Rangers F.C.
 Deeping Rangers F.C.
 Hall Road Rangers F.C.
 Hertfordshire Rangers F.C.
 Highfield Rangers F.C.
 Kintbury Rangers F.C.
 Northampton Sileby Rangers F.C.
 Paget Rangers F.C.
 Queens Park Rangers F.C.
 Risborough Rangers F.C.
 Smethwick Rangers F.C.
 Soham Town Rangers F.C.
 St Francis Rangers F.C.
 Stafford Rangers F.C.
 Thurnby Rangers F.C.
 Winterton Rangers F.C.
 Central Park Rangers

Hong Kong teams 
 Hong Kong Rangers FC

Kenyan team 
 Posta Rangers F.C.

New Zealand teams 
 Rangers A.F.C.
 Miramar Rangers

Nigerian team 
 Enugu Rangers

Northern Irish teams 
 Ards Rangers F.C.
 Ballymacash Rangers F.C.
 Bangor Rangers F.C.
 Bryansburn Rangers F.C.
 Carrick Rangers F.C.
 Glebe Rangers F.C.
 Killymoon Rangers F.C.
 Lisburn Rangers F.C.
 Newington Rangers F.C.
 Rathfern Rangers F.C.
 Rathfriland Rangers F.C.

Scottish teams 
 Arniston Rangers F.C.
 Berwick Rangers F.C.
 Brora Rangers F.C.
 Cambuslang Rangers F.C.
 Cove Rangers F.C.
 Cowdenbeath Rangers F.C.
 Glasgow Rangers F.C.
 Kilsyth Rangers F.C.
 Kilwinning Rangers F.C.
 Rangers Ladies F.C.

Sierra Leonean team 
 Kakua Rangers F.C.

Welsh team 
 Penrhiwceiber Rangers F.C.

Rangers
English names